Casa de Vecindad ("Dwelling") is a 1964 comedic-drama Mexican telenovela. Each episode is of 30 minutes duration. The telenovela is often referred to as La Vecindad. There is a film called Casa de Vecindad.

The producer Julissa was the lead in the telenovela; other notable actors appeared in the series: Jacqueline Andere, Enrique Álvarez Félix and Ofelia Guilmáin. Andere and Félix later worked on the thriller La Casa del Pelícano.

Cast 
 Enrique Álvarez Félix
 Rafael del Río
 Emily Cranz
 Silvia Fournier
 Carlos Riquelme
 Jacqueline Andere
 Ofelia Guilmáin
 Julissa
 Miguel Manzano
 Carmen Salinas

References

External links 

Mexican telenovelas